Pancho Angelo Acuña Magno (born 2 October 1986) is a Filipino actor. He is the oldest son of Redgie Magno, VP for Drama Productions, GMA Network.

Filmography

Television

References

External links
 

1986 births
Living people
People from Marikina
Male actors from Metro Manila
Filipino male television actors
Filipino male models
Filipino Christians
Filipino evangelicals
GMA Network personalities